Aitraaz is a 2004 Indian Hindi-language romantic thriller film directed by Abbas–Mustan and produced by Subhash Ghai. It stars Akshay Kumar, Priyanka Chopra and Kareena Kapoor.

Aitraaz tells the story of a man accused of sexual harassment by his female superior, and was released on 12 November 2004 to positive reviews. Chopra received widespread critical acclaim for her performance. Loosely based on the 1994 film Disclosure, the film was a commercial success grossing 260 million at the box office against a budget of 80 million, and has been noted for its bold subject of sexual harassment.

Aitraaz received several accolades, particularly for Chopra. At the 50th Filmfare Awards, Chopra was nominated for the Best Supporting Actress and Best Villain, winning the latter and thus becoming the second (and final) actress to win the award. Chopra also won the Bengal Film Journalists' Association Award for Best Actress and the Screen Award for Best Villain. The film received ten nominations at the 2005 IIFA Awards, winning three.

Plot
Raj Malhotra is an orphaned person living in Cape Town, South Africa. One day, he comes across glamorous model Sonia Kapoor. They fall in love and begin a live-in relationship, though Raj always feels insecure due to explicit men reactions on Sonia's modelling photos. Upon knowing she is pregnant, Raj wishes to marry her but she refuses and decides to abort the child to pursue her ambitions of wealth, fame and power thinking marriage and child as burden. As a result, they break up.

3 years later
Raj, now settled at a rented house in India, is a product engineer for mobile manufacturing company Voice Mobiles. Junior lawyer Priya Saxena visits his house for an interview, mistaking him as his neighbour friend Barrister Ram Chotrani. Raj develops a love at first sight for Priya, who also accepts him and they get happily married.

2 years later
Priya is pregnant with Raj's child. They move into their own house, a bungalow, and expect Raj's promotion to CEO. On the company's anniversary, its chairman and Raj's boss Ranjit Roy arrives with his third much younger wife none other than Sonia, which stuns Raj as they encounter each other after 5 years. Sonia, being the new chairperson and managing director, appoints his friend Rakesh as CEO and Raj on the board of directors. Still, Raj behaves to her like a stranger in front of everyone.

Rakesh informs Raj about a defect in the company's new mobile handset, which causes calls to be simultaneously placed to two people—the intended recipient and another random person from the phone's contact list. Raj needs Sonia's authorisation to stop production, and thus visits her at her house. She makes provocative and sexually explicit statements to Raj though he ignores. Later when he dials Rakesh's number, the phone slips down as Sonia comes and sticks to him from the back. Shocked, Raj rejects her advances but Sonia attempts to seduce him. However, he leaves her again.

Next day, Raj learns Sonia has falsely accused him of sexual harassment and attempted rape and that Ranjit demanded that he resign quietly as to not negatively impact the company. At the end of the day, Priya finds the resignation letter in his jacket pocket and asks why. Raj explains what happened the night he visited Sonia and had gotten counsel from Ram earlier who advised him to not chase up the matter. Priya, however feels differently and encourages Raj to not resign, explaining that the lie will be assumed as the truth if he does. Raj gives his case to Ram which goes court, gaining massive media attention, affecting Raj negatively.

Raj's bank manager returns from abroad sometime after Raj's first court hearing with a genuine tape that recorded his visit at Sonia's house due to the defect in the handset. After playing it back with Ram and Priya, Ram submits the tape for forensic testing. However, upon retrieving the tape, Ram is injured in an accident, which was secretly orchestrated by Sonia. Ram's assistant swaps the tape for a destroyed fake one and has it delivered to Sonia, who destroys it. She phones Raj and tells him to meet with her if he wants to have his normal life back. Unbeknownst to Raj however, Priya is also listening to the call. Sonia fantasises of Raj giving in to her but is informed that Priya wants to meet with her instead of Raj. Priya then enters her office and Sonia states that she can save Raj for a price; he would be a keep-man for her for life. Priya refuses the offer and challenges that she can save Raj from going to jail.

With Ram recovering in the hospital, Priya decides to pick up the case as Raj's lawyer. She exposes Sonia and Raj's past relationship and plays Rakesh's voice mail. This ends up in revealing that Rakesh's phone had saved the message. It turns out that Sonia married Ranjit for money, power and status but as he couldn't satisfy her sexually, she tried to resume her relation with Raj.

In the end, Priya wins the case and Ranjit files for divorce from Sonia for the latter's infidelity. Guilt-stricken and humiliated, Sonia commits suicide by jumping from a building.

Months later, Raj and Priya walk with their newborn child as the story ends.

Cast
The cast is listed below:
 Akshay Kumar as Raj Malhotra
 Priyanka Chopra as Sonia Kapoor Roy
 Kareena Kapoor as Advocate Priya Saxena Malhotra
 Amrish Puri as Ranjit Roy
 Annu Kapoor as Barrister Ram Chotrani
 Paresh Rawal as Advocate Ravi Patel
 Vivek Shauq as Rakesh Sharma
 Preeti Puri as Jenny
 Upasana Singh as Kanchan Chotrani
 Dinesh Lamba as Garv
 Anil Nagrath as Judge Anupam Choudhary

Production

The director duo Abbas–Mustan took inspiration from National Basketball Association player Kobe Bryant, who was accused of rape by a fan; they began developing the film after reading about his sexual-assault case in the newspapers. Regarding the film's unusual title, they said the word aitraaz was colloquial and suited the subject. Shyam Goel and Shiraz Ahmed wrote the screenplay. Hussain A. Burmawala and R. Verman were responsible for film editing and art direction, respectively.

The film was announced in October 2003 by producer Subhash Ghai, to commemorate the 25th anniversary of his production company Mukta Arts. The media reported that Akshay Kumar, Kareena Kapoor and Priyanka Chopra were cast in lead roles, making it the third film collaboration between Kumar and Chopra after the highly successful Andaaz (2003) and Mujhse Shaadi Karogi (2004). Kumar was cast as Raj, a working man accused of rape at his workplace; Kapoor portrayed his supportive wife, who goes to extremes to defend him. According to the directors, Kumar was cast against type; he generally played action heroes, and they wanted him to underplay his character. Abbas–Mustan, known for stylish thrillers and intriguing antagonists, cast Chopra in her first negative role. She plays a woman, married to a business magnate more than twice her age, who seeks revenge by falsely accusing her former lover of raping her. Chopra was initially apprehensive about such a bold character, due to the controversial theme of sexual harassment, but Abbas–Mastan and Subhash Ghai convinced her to accept the role. The director duo had previously offered her the lead in their 2002 thriller Humraaz, which she could not accept.

Kumar described his character as "realistic" and a "new-age metrosexual" man. The actor revealed that he enjoyed the strengths and weaknesses of his character, adding "[he] is not afraid to show his feelings and does not feel emasculated by his situation." Kumar further stated: "There's a quiet dignity and heroism associated with my character. He doesn't fight for applause. He fights for his convictions." In an interview with The Tribune, Kapoor remarked that Indian women would identify with her character. She said her character "stand[s] by [Raj] in his moment of distress and helplessness, like every Indian woman would." Chopra described her character Sonia as "charming and focused", commenting that her "philosophy is that she has to achieve her goals at any cost. She knows one thing: that nothing can come in between her desires and herself." Owing to her conservative upbringing, Chopra found it difficult to identify with her "man-eater role". Playing an "extremely negative character" proved a challenge, and she had to mentally prepare herself for an hour before each scene.

Manish Malhotra and Vikram Phadnis designed the costumes and the cinematography was handled by Ravi Yadav. The film was mainly shot in Cape Town, Goa, Pune and Mumbai. Chopra, who was simultaneously filming four other productions, revealed that because of her busy schedule the producers of her other films had to move their sets to the Filmistan Studio, where Aitraaz was being made. She wept during filming of the sexual-harassment scene; it took the directors several hours to remind her she was only playing a character, and further filming was postponed. The music video of the title track "Aitraaz – I Want to Make Love to You" with Kumar and Chopra was shot in one take with a Steadicam. Salim–Sulaiman composed the background score for the film.

Soundtrack

Aitraazs soundtrack was composed by Himesh Reshammiya, with lyrics by Sameer. The album contains fifteen songs: seven original, and eight remixes. The vocals were performed by Udit Narayan, Alka Yagnik, Sunidhi Chauhan, Adnan Sami, K.K., and Alisha Chinai. It was released on 24 September 2004 by Sony Music India.

The soundtrack was generally well received by music critics, who praised its lyrics and vocals. Planet Bollywood gave a rating of 7 out of 10, calling it a "good album". Joginder Tuteja of Bollywood Hungama rated the album 3 out of 5, praising "I Want To Make Love To You" (all three versions): "Sunidhi Chauhan is excellent in this wonderfully-composed track that shocks everyone with the intensity of the lyrics and the music". He concluded, "Except for two or three average songs here and there, the majority of songs in Aitraaz do keep you engaged".

The music topped charts on a number of platforms in India. The soundtrack was one of the best-selling Bollywood soundtracks of the year, with 1.5 million units sold according to Box Office India.

Marketing and release
The first-look poster of the film, with the tagline "In the world of women, you either play by their rules or else ...", was received positively by critics; the film's trailers were also well received. In October 2004, exclusive footage from the film was screened to the trade experts and critics, creating a positive buzz. The film's trailers and the film's music aided its marketing.

Made on a production and marketing budget of  million, Aitraaz released on 375 screens on 12 November 2004 during the festive Diwali weekend. It clashed with three other major releases: Veer-Zaara, the coloured version of Mughal-e-Azam, and Naach. The film opened to excellent occupancy in metros and decent at other places. It was the second-best playing release of the week after Yash Chopra's Veer-Zaara. According to Box Office India, the film grossed approximately 45 million on its opening weekend and 76 million in its first week at the domestic box office. After its run, Aitraaz grossed over 278 million at the box office, becoming the tenth highest-grossing Bollywood film of the year. The film was deemed a commercial success.

The DVD of the film was released on 6 December 2004 across all regions in a PAL-format single disc. Distributed by Shemaroo Entertainment, it included a making-of-the-film segment and a photo gallery. The VCD version was released at the same time, and Zee Network bought the exclusive broadcast rights. Aitraaz made its Indian television premiere on 30 October 2005 on Zee Cinema. The film was remade in Kannada as Shrimathi (2011), starring Upendra, Priyanka Trivedi and Celina Jaitley.

Critical response

Aitraaz received generally positive reviews from critics, who praised its direction, music and performances, particularly Chopra's. It was noted for its bold treatment of sexual harassment. Several critics observed that the premise was similar to the American film Disclosure (1994). Writing for the BBC, critic Jay Mamtora praised the film's theme, music and performances, and remarked that "Abbas-Mustaan have done a good job in 'Indianising' the whole concept". He went on to describe it as "a gripping edge of the seat drama that keeps viewers glued to their seats". Taran Adarsh of Bollywood Hungama rated the film 3.5 out of 5, calling it "a well-crafted thriller" and complimenting the directors' opting for "a theme that has been untouched on the Indian screen so far" and the film's "dramatic moments".

Like Mamtora, Adarsh believed that the film belonged entirely to Priyanka Chopra, and was impressed with her understanding of the character, writing that "She sneaks her way through the role like an expert, drawing audience hatred the way a magnet collects iron filings." He also complimented the performances by Kapoor and Kumar. Patcy N of Rediff.com noted the film's appeal to the general public, finding its subject matter "something different from the standard fare on offer". She also praised the music and choreography. Writing for India Today, film critic Anupama Chopra lauded Chopra's "impressive" performance, and deemed the film "good timepass".

Sudhish Kamath of The Hindu commented that "though the first half of the movie is well-paced, the second half sags with the songs and twists forced into the plot to buy time", but stated that it was "passable with its slick production, a few funny lines, glam quotient and star appeal." Subhash K. Jha criticised the film's "dishy digressions" and "peripheral sub-plots", rating it 2 out of 5 overall, but was impressed with the court scene, which he considered "splendid". He also found Chopra's performance to be a triumph, remarking: "A star is born! As the predatory social-climbing seductress who can go to any length to satiate her lust for life, Priyanka Chopra rocks the scene like never before." Jha believed that Kareena was miscast and seemed a little awkward in a non-glamorous role, but "comes into her own in the climactic courtroom sequence", a sentiment echoed by Jitesh Pillai in his review for The Times of India. Pillai gave a rating of 3 out of 5 and noted that "it isn't drama that directors were striving for, yet the film works."

Accolades

Explanatory notes

Citations

Further reading

External links
 
 

2000s Hindi-language films
2004 films
2004 romantic drama films
2000s romantic thriller films
Indian courtroom films
Films scored by Himesh Reshammiya
Films directed by Abbas–Mustan
Films shot in South Africa
Indian erotic thriller films
Indian erotic drama films
Indian romantic drama films
Indian legal films
Indian romantic thriller films
Films about sexual harassment
Hindi films remade in other languages
Hindi-language thriller films
2000s erotic thriller films
Fiction with false allegations of sex crimes